Gavril Ivanovici Buciuşcan (27 March 1889 in Isacova – 23 October 1937 in Tiraspol) was a Bessarabian politician.

He served as Member of the Moldovan Parliament (1917–1918) and Commissar for Education of the Moldavian Autonomous Soviet Socialist Republic. Buciuşcan was killed on 23 October 1937 in Tiraspol, during the Great Purge.

Works 
 G. Buciuşcanu, Gramatica limbii moldoveneşti, Balta, 1925.

Bibliography 
Gheorghe E. Cojocaru, Sfatul Țării: itinerar, Civitas, Chişinău, 1998, 
Mihai Taşcă, Sfatul Țării şi actualele autorităţi locale, "Timpul de dimineaţă", no. 114 (849), June 27, 2008 (page 16)

External links 
 Arhiva pentru Sfatul Tarii
 Deputaţii Sfatului Ţării şi Lavrenti Beria

Notes

1889 births
1937 deaths
People from Orhei District
People from Orgeyevsky Uyezd
Moldovan MPs 1917–1918
Politicians of the Moldavian Autonomous Soviet Socialist Republic
Great Purge victims from Moldova
Bessarabian Bolsheviks